Midas Man is an upcoming British biographical film about the life of music entrepreneur Brian Epstein. Directed by Sara Sugarman, who replaced Jonas Åkerlund during filming, it is based on a story by Brigit Grant and a screenplay by Brigit Grant, Jonathan Wakeham and Billy Dietrich. Jacob Fortune-Lloyd stars in the lead role alongside Emily Watson, Eddie Marsan, Omari Douglas, Rosie Day, Lukas Gage, Charley Palmer Rothwell, Bill Milner, Jay Leno, Jonah Lees, Blake Richardson, Leo Harvey Elledge, Campbell Wallace and Adam Lawrence.

Premise
The film tracks how Brian Epstein rose to prominence by managing a series of popular artists including The Beatles, Cilla Black and Gerry and the Pacemakers before his sudden death in 1967 at the age of 32.

Cast
 Jacob Fortune-Lloyd as Brian Epstein
 Emily Watson as Malka, Epstein's mother
 Eddie Marsan as Harry, Epstein's father
 Omari Douglas as Lonnie Trimble
 Rosie Day as Cilla Black
 Lukas Gage as Tex Ellington
 Charley Palmer Rothwell as George Martin
 Bill Milner as Clive, Epstein's brother
 Jay Leno as Ed Sullivan
 Jonah Lees as John Lennon
 Blake Richardson as Paul McCartney
 Leo Harvey Elledge as George Harrison
 Campbell Wallace as Ringo Starr
 Adam Lawrence as Pete Best
 Jordan Kelly as Gerry Marsden
 Darci Shaw as Sonia Seligson

Production

Development

Midas Man is a biographical film about Brian Epstein based on a story by Brigit Grant and screenplay by Brigit Grant, Jonathan Wakeham and Billy Dietrich. It is a British co-production between Studio POW and Trevor Beattie Films. It is also produced by Er Dong Pictures, who will distribute the film in China. In July 2020, Jonas Åkerlund was announced to direct. In an interview with The Guardian, Åkerlund said he had been researching Epstein for almost two years. He also said he had talked with people who knew Epstein, including Gerry Marsden of Gerry and the Pacemakers: "He told me stories that haven't been printed yet and that we'll introduce into our film." In April 2021, Jacob Fortune-Lloyd was cast in the lead role as Brian Epstein. In July, the film's distribution rights in the U.K. and Ireland were sold to Signature Entertainment. In the following months, Emily Watson, Eddie Marsan and Omari Douglas were cast in September, and Rosie Day, Lukas Gage, Charley Palmer Rothwell and Bill Milner were cast in October.

Filming
The 12-week shoot began in Liverpool on 11 October 2021. Principal photography, however, was put on hiatus for three weeks after Åkerlund left the production in November. An issued statement made the claim that filming would continue that same month in London and move to Los Angeles, California, in early January. Sara Sugarman has been hired as Åkerlund's replacement, with no reshoots expected to take place, and filming scheduled to start again soon. In late November, Jay Leno, Jonah Lees, Blake Richardson, Leo Harvey Elledge, Campbell Wallace and Adam Lawrence joined the cast and a first-look image was released featuring several cast members at Abbey Road Studios. An issued statement said that after a three month break, filming would begin in the U.S. in late January 2022 before returning to the U.K.

References

External links
 

Biographical films about musicians
British biographical films
British films based on actual events
Films about the Beatles
Films directed by Jonas Åkerlund
Films shot in England
Films shot in London
Films shot in Los Angeles
Upcoming English-language films
Upcoming films
2020s English-language films
2020s British films